Defeminization and masculinization are the processes that a fetus goes through to become a male. 

It has often been said by biologists that in sexual differentiation in mammals, the female is the "default" developmental pathway, in the sense that elimination of any of several gene actions necessary for formation of male genitalia leads to the development of external female genitalia (though development of functional ovaries requires effective action of several less understood sex-specific genes).  Two processes: defeminization, and masculinization, are involved in producing male typical morphology and behavior.

Defeminization involves the suppression of the development of female typical morphology (development of the Müllerian ducts into the fallopian tubes, uterus and vagina) and behavioural predispositions.  Masculinization involves the production of male typical morphology (development of the Wolffian ducts into male reproductive structures) and behavioural predispositions.  Both defeminization and masculinization are required for a mammalian zygote to become a fully reproductively functional male.

A brief version of the female default paradigm can be stated as follows:

A set of specific genetic instructions must be present and a series of differentiating events mediated by hormones must occur in order for a mammalian zygote to become a fully reproductively functional male.
The Y chromosome, SRY, SOX9, and SF1 genes must be present and functional.
Functional Leydig cells must form in the gonads.
The Leydig cells must be able to produce testosterone.
The target cells must have the hormone receptors to respond to the testosterone. The target cells of the external genitalia must have functional 5-alpha-reductase enzyme to convert some of the testosterone to more active dihydrotestosterone.
There is some evidence that the brain must be exposed and respond to androgens either prenatally or early in life to produce characteristic mating behavior. This is well demonstrated in many animal species but remains mostly speculative with respect to humans.
To a large extent, each step builds on the previous. If anything goes wrong at any of the first four steps, the subsequent pathway of development results in female anatomy and behavior.
No ovarian organizing gene homologous to SRY has been discovered. Both sexes are exposed to maternal estrogen prenatally. No hormones have yet been discovered that are necessary early in life to produce female sexual development. Estrogen seems not to be necessary until puberty for purposes of differentiation.
The full development of male characteristics also includes personal experience throughout life, determining gender identity, gender roles and sexual orientation. However, there is much debate on the balance between nature and nurture in the determination.

History
This paradigm dates back to the 1950s. Even stronger versions were commonly stated in the 1960s and 1970s. One version, perhaps most associated with John Money, (who termed it the Adam principle), held that additional steps in the cascade to male identity were the recognition by parents and doctor that the external genitalia were male, which resulted in a male sex assignment, which in turn resulted in a male sex of rearing by parents and society, which in turn (coupled with the reinforcing appearance of male genitalia) resulted in a male gender identity. At least by implication, female gender identity simply required a female sex of rearing and lack of an obvious penis.

See also
 Feminization

References

Sexual anatomy
Zoology
Male